Astronaut Status is the ninth mixtape by American rapper Future. It was released on January 12, 2012. The album features guest appearances from rappers Gucci Mane, Young Jeezy, Ludacris and Rocko. 
Future previously stated Streetz Calling would be his last mixtape, before his debut full-length album Pluto, but instead released Astronaut Status in 2012, making it his last official mixtape. "Itchin'" peaked at #2 on the Bubbling Under R&B/Hip-Hop Songs chart. Since the release of Astronaut Status, it has been downloaded over 250k times on DatPiff, certifying it platinum. Astronaut Status also charted at #50 on the Billboard Heatseekers Chart.

Critical reception
Pitchforks Jordan Sargent called Astronaut Status "Future's strongest, most listenable mixtape yet ... [though] in the murky waters of pop-rap hitmaking, it's hard to tell if anything on Astronaut Status stands up to the songs that helped Future ascend to this status in the first place." 
Adam Fleischer of XXL wrote that "Future often relies on his materialistic musings to carry Astronaut Status", and his attempts to stray from that formula are inconsistent. Fleischer added: "It's apparent that Future knows the components of a catchy street chant, it's just a matter of whether or not he can deliver every time." 
The mixtape ranked 13th on Stereogums list of the top 40 rap albums of 2012. Tom Breihan said the mixtape contains "some of rap's catchiest mantras of the year."

Track listing

References

Albums produced by Zaytoven
Epic Records albums
2012 mixtape albums
Albums produced by Mike Will Made It
Albums produced by Sonny Digital
Future (rapper) albums